Maharaja is a Sanskrit title for a "great king" or "high king".

Maharaja may also refer to:
 Maharaja (1998 film), an Indian Bollywood Hindi film directed by Anil Sharma
 Maharaja (2005 film), an Indian Kannada-language film directed by Om Sai Prakash
 Maharaja (2011 film), an Indian Tamil film directed by Manoharan
 Maharaja: The Game of Palace Building in India, a game designed by Wolfgang Kramer
 Maharaja Lela (ship), a frigate in the Malaysian Maharaja Lela-class

See also
 Raja (disambiguation)
 High King (disambiguation), literal translation of maharaja